Cédric Decoire (born 15 May 1994) is a New Caledonian footballer who plays as a midfielder for New Caledonian club AS Mont-Dore and the New Caledonian national team.

Club career
Decoire started his career in the youth of AS Mont-Dore. After he made his debut in 2011 for the first team he played in the OFC Champions League of 2012 and 2013. In 2014 he moved to France to play for Ardennes clubsite OFC Charleville. In 2017 he moved to back to New Caledonia to play for AS Mont Dore again.

National team
In 2018, Decoire was called up by coach Thierry Sardo for a friendly against Tahiti national football team. He played the whole 90 minutes in a 0 all draw on March 21, 2018.

International goals
Scores and results list New Caledonia's goal tally first.

References

New Caledonian footballers
Association football midfielders
New Caledonia international footballers
Living people
1994 births
AS Mont-Dore players